Hugh Crawford was launched in 1810 in the United States as Orbit. The British Royal Navy captured her in 1813. She was sold as a prize and her purchasers renamed her Hugh Crawford. She traded with India and Australia and twice carried immigrants to Australia. She was last listed in 1833, but with data stale since 1827

Career
On 29 January 1813  captured the American ship Orbit, of 390 tons (bm), six guns, and 25 men. Orbit was sailing from New York to Bordeaux with a cargo of cotton, pearl, and potash. She had been launched in 1810 at New York.

She was sold as a prize and her new owners named her Hugh Crawford. She entered Lloyd's Register (LR) in 1813 with Niels, master, Crawford, owner, and trade Plymouth-West Indies.

What enables one to make the link between Orbit and Hugh Crawford is a mistake in the Register of Shipping (RS) in 1814. It mistakenly carried both Hugh Crawford and Orbit, the publishers not realizing that Orbit had become Hugh Crawford.

In September 1815 Hugh Crawford arrived at Bristol. She had left Honduras on 1 August in company with Samuel and Sarah, bound for London, and Regent, bound for Hull.

In 1813 the EIC had lost its monopoly on the trade between India and Britain. British ships were then free to sail to India or the Indian Ocean under a license from the EIC. W. Athol sailed Hugh Crawford from London on 17 April 1818.

Hugh Crawford, Athol, master, returned to the Clyde on 22 March 1819. She had left Bengal on 3 November 1818 and the Sand Heads on the 11th. She was at St Helena on 15 January 1819. On 10 February on her way home she encountered a Buenos Ayrean privateer. The privateer wanted to put 38 Spanish prisoners on Hugh Crawford but Athol refused to take them.  

The Register of Shipping still carried both Hugh Crawford and Orbit in 1820, but the data for Orbit was stale. On 28 January 1820, Lloyd's List (LL) reported that Hugh Crawford, Holliday, master, had been sailing from Charleston to Greenock when on 20 January she had struck on some rocks in the Clyde, about six miles from Dunoon. LL reported that she was totally wrecked and her cargo, though salvageable, was in a severely distressed state. The news of her loss proved to be exaggerated. By 1821 she was again appearing in LLs ship arrival and departure (SAD) data.

By the 1825 issue Orbit had disappeared from the RS, and both registers were in essential agreement on Hugh Crawford.

Hugh Crawford made two voyages carrying emigrants from England to Australia. 

On 20 November 1823 she was at St Helena, on her way back to England from Valparaiso. She arrived at London on 15 January 1824 with Wilson, master. On 5 December 1824 she was at Portsmouth on her way to New South Wales with Langdon, master. She arrived at the Cape Verde islands on 31 December and left for New South Wales on 4 January 1825. She arrived at Sydney on Sunday 3 April. She had carried 57 settlers, five of whom disembarked at Van Diemen's Land. She also brought 122 sheep and eight head of horned cattle. 

From Sydney Hugh Crawford sailed on 10 June to Batavia, Dutch East Indies, via the Torres Islands. Hugh Crawford arrived at Batavia on 2 July. Her arrival coincided with the outbreak of the Java War. On 3 July she sailed for Singapore.

On 23 June Langdon sailed from Gravesend and on the 27th from Deal, bound for New South Wales. On 27 July Hugh Crawford reached Santiago, Cape Verde. She arrived at Sydney on 22 November. On 26 December a sudden shift of the wind pushed her aground. Langdon had apparently brought a band for the amusement of his passengers, which band also played in Sydney, as did the band of Warspite. 

On 23 March 1827 Langdon sailed Hugh Crawford from Hobart, Tasmania, en route to England via Cape Horn. She arrived at the Falkland Islands on 22 May after having become becalmed off Cape Horn for five weeks. Hugh Crawford sailed from the Falklands on 25 May.

Fate
Hugh Crawford was last listed in 1833, but with data unchanged since 1827.

Citations and references
Citations

References
 
 

1810 ships
Ships built in the United States
Captured ships
Age of Sail merchant ships of England
Maritime incidents in January 1820